The Santos Basin is an approximately  large mostly offshore sedimentary basin. The basin is one of the Brazilian basins to have resulted from the break-up of Gondwana since the Early Cretaceous, where a sequence of rift basins formed on both sides of the South Atlantic; the Pelotas, Santos, Campos and Espírito Santo Basins in Brazil, and the Namibia, Kwanza and Congo Basins in southwestern Africa.

Santos Basin is separated from the Campos Basin to the north by the Cabo Frio High and the Pelotas Basin in the south by the Florianópolis High and the northwestern boundary onshore is formed by the Serra Do Mar coastal range. The basin is known for its thick layers of salt that have formed structures in the subsurface due to halokinesis. The basin started forming in the Early Cretaceous on top of the Congo Craton as a rift basin. The rift stage of the basin evolution combined with the arid Aptian climate of the southern latitudes resulted in the deposition of evaporites in the Late Aptian, approximately 112 million years ago. The phase of rifting was followed by a thermal sag phase and drift stage in the widening of the South Atlantic Ocean.

One of the largest Brazilian sedimentary basins, it is the site of several recently (2007 and later) discovered giant oil and gas fields, including the first large pre-salt discovery Tupi (8 billion barrels), Júpiter (1.6 billion barrels and 17 tcf of gas), and Libra, with an estimated 8 to 12 billion barrels of recoverable oil. Main source rocks are the lacustrine shales and carbonates of the pre-salt Guaratiba Group and the marine shales of the post-salt Itajaí-Açu Formation. Reservoir rocks are formed by the pre-salt Guaratiba sandstones, limestones and microbialites, the Albian limestones of the Guarujá Formation and the Late Cretaceous to Paleogene turbiditic sandstones of the Itanhaém, Juréia, Itajaí-Açu, Florianópolis and Marambaia Formations. The mobile salt of the Ariri Formation forms regional seals, as well as the shales of the post-salt sedimentary infill. In 2017, the Santos Basin accounted for 35% of Brazil's oil, with the northern neighbour Campos Basin at 55%.

Etymology 
The Santos Basin is named after the coastal city of Santos in the state of São Paulo.

Description 

The Santos Basin is a mostly offshore sedimentary basin across the Tropic of Capricorn, bordering from north to south the Brazilian states of Rio de Janeiro, Sáo Paulo, Paraná and Santa Catarina.

Along the Brazilian coast, the basin is bounded by the Serra do Mar and stretches from Cabo Frio in the northeast to Florianópolis in the southwest. The city of Rio de Janeiro is located at the coastal edge of the Santos Basin in the northern portion, Santos, Guarujá and the islands of Ilhabela in the central area and Itajaí and Balneário Camboriú in the south of the basin. Within the basin, several highs are located. The Outer High is likely a segmented series of rift fault-block shoulders which were uplifted and eroded during the Late Barremian.

The climate of the onshore stretch of the basin ranges from tropical savanna climate (Aw), tropical monsoon climate (Am) and tropical rainforest climate (Af) to a humid subtropical climate (Cfa). The onshore portion of the Santos Basin is in the Serra do Mar coastal forests ecoregion of the Atlantic Forest biome. On the islands of the Superagüi National Park in the Santos Basin, the endemic critically endangered Superagüi lion tamarin (Leontopithecus caissara) has its restricted habitat.

Tectonic history 

The South Atlantic margin developed on Archean stable cratons consisting of hard and resistant rocks and partly on the Neoproterozoic mobile belts composed of less resistant metamorphic rocks. The Precambrian basement of the Santos Basin is exposed as the Araçuaí Belt along the Brazilian coast, most notably in the inselbergs of Rio de Janeiro, of which Sugarloaf Mountain is the most iconic. The ancient rocks consist of a Neoproterozoic to Cambrian high-grade metamorphic core of granites and gneisses, formed during the collision of Gondwana in the Pan-African-Brasiliano orogeny. Basalts similar to the Paraná and Etendeka traps, exposed to the west in the Paraná Basin, have been found underlying the Santos Basin. The Tristan da Cunha hotspot, known as the Tristan hotspot, is considered the driver behind the formation of these flood basalts.

During the Early Cretaceous, the former continent Gondwana, as southern part of Pangea, starting to break-up, resulting in a sequence of rift basins bordering the present-day South Atlantic. The Pelotas-Namibia spreading commenced in the Hauterivian, around 133 million years ago and reached the Santos Basin to the north in the Barremian. Seafloor spreading continued northwards to the Campos Basin in the Early Albian, at approximately 112 Ma.

Five tectonic stages have been identified in the Brazilian basins:
 Pre-rift stage - Jurassic to Valanginian
 Syn-rift stage - Hauterivian to Late Barremian
 Sag stage - Late Barremian to Late Aptian
 Post-rift stage - Early to Middle Albian
 Drift stage - Late Albian to Holocene

The Late Aptian climate was arid with high evaporation rates which triggered hypersaline conditions in these marginal sag basins. This resulted in the accumulation of thick layers of evaporites along the Brazilian and southwestern African continental margins, a process continuing towards the north later in the Cretaceous. The deposition of the lowermost  of salt in the Aptian would have taken approximately 20,000 to 30,000 years. With the continental break-up of the Santos and Campos Basins from the opposite Namibia and Kwanza Basins, oceanic circulation returned during the post-rift stage. The drift phase since the Late Cretaceous produced a thick sequence of clastic and carbonate deposits. Differential thermal regimes and sediment loading of these units produced halokinesis; salt movement in the subsurface. The resulting salt diapirs, listric and thrust faults and various salt-related structures produced several stratigraphic and combined stratigraphic-structural traps for hydrocarbon accumulation in the Brazilian and southwest African offshore.

During the phases of halokinesis, dated to the Albian to Paleocene, several areas of the now deep water distal part of the Santos Basin were exposed to subaerial conditions and suffered erosion. The distal parts of the basin were affected by E-W to NW-SE oriented shortening, sub-perpendicular to the Brazilian margin.

Stratigraphy 

The basement of the Santos Basin is composed of granites and gneisses of the Araçuarí Belt that formed at the western boundary of the Congo Craton. The erosion resistant metamorphic and magmatic rocks are exposed in the Serra do Mar, forming the edge of the Santos Basin along the Brazilian coast.

I - Guaratiba Group (Hauterivian-Aptian, pre-salt sequence) 

The group is equivalent to the Lagoa Feia Group of the Campos Basin.

Camboriú Formation
The basalts are dark green to dark grey, holocrystalline, medium grained, with an ophiolitic texture. The main components are plagioclase and augite, usually fresh, non-altered.

Piçarras Formation
The formation includes reddish polymictic conglomerates, with clasts of basalt and quartz in a clay-sandy matrix. It also includes white, reddish lacustrine coquinas (shelly limestones) and sandstones, siltstones and shales of stevensite composition. Its age, based on the ostracod assemblages, is Hauterivian to Aptian.

The conglomerates and sandstones of the formation are representative of an alluvial environment. The coquinas represent a shallow lacustrine environment. Similar to the Atafona Formation of the Campos Basin, the sandstones, stevensite-bearing siltstones and shales represent an alkaline lacustrine environment affected by volcanic activity. The shales represent deeper lacustrine waters in more distal areas. The alternation of the two facies implies a series of alluvial progradation-retractions into the Cretaceous carbonate lakes. The low textural and compositional maturity of conglomerates and sandstones implies the basin was supplied from areas close to the basin margins.

Itapema Formation
The Itapema Formation is several hundreds of metres thick and consists of calcirudites (limestones) and dark shales. The calcirudite limestones consist of fragmented bivalve shells, frequently dolomitized and silicified. In more distal sections, the formation consists of dark organic matter rich shales. In the well 1-RSJ-625, the formation includes  of radioactive shales interbedded with carbonates. These facies are thought to represent a lacustrine environment. The organic matter-rich shales are one of the main source rocks of the Santos Basin. This formation is correlative with the Coqueiros Formation in the Campos Basin. The age of the Itapema Formation is Barremian to Aptian.

Barra Velha Formation
In the proximal sections, the formation comprises limestones of stromatolites and laminated microbialites. In the distal sections, it is composed of shales. Interbedded with the laminated microbialites there are limestones with packstone and grainstone textures made up of algal clasts and bioclasts (fragmented ostracods). The carbonates frequently are partly or completely dolomitized. These facies represent a transitional continental and shallow marine environment. The age of this formation has been estimated to be Late Barremian to Aptian. It is correlative with the Macabu Formation in the Campos Basin, as both are typified by laminated microbialites and stromatolites. These limestones are one of the sub-salt reservoirs in the Santos Basin.

II - Ariri Formation (Late Aptian, salt sequence) 

It is predominantly composed of evaporites. The formation is characterized by thick intervals of white halite, associated with white anhydrite, ochre greyish calcilutites, shales and marls. The sedimentary environment probably was restricted marine including mudflat sabkhas, evolving under an arid climate. The ostracod assemblages of this formation indicate a neo-Algoas age (local time scale).

III - Camburi Group (Albian-Cenomanian, lower post-salt sequence) 

Florianópolis Formation
These clastic units are thought to represent alluvial environments distributed along the western Brazilian basin margin, along the Santos Hinge Line. These alluvial environments were gradational towards the east, with the shallow marine carbonates of the Guarujá Formation, and further to the open basin with the siltstones of the Itanhaém Formation. Biostratigraphical data and its relations with the Guarujá Formation point towards an Albian age.

Guarujá Formation
These facies are interbedded with the alluvial clastics of the Florianópolis Formation. The Guarujá name is restricted to the lowest limestone intercalation, previously named Lower Guarujá by Ojeda and Ahranha in Pereira and Feijó (1994). The microfacies indicate a tidal flat to shallow lagoon and open carbonate platform depositional environment. The age based on planktonic foraminifera and pollen is Early Albian.

Itanhaém Formation
These facies change laterally into the coarse clastics of the Florianópolis Formation. Facies analysis indicates a marine environment ranging from sub-littoral (inner neritic) and more rarely to pelagic (outer bathyal) conditions. The age based on planktonic foraminifera and pollen is Early Albian.

IV - Frade Group (Turonian-Maastrichtian, middle post-salt sequence) 

They predominantly comprise turbidites.

Santos Formation
These facies are interbedded and change laterally into the Itajai-Açu and Juréia Formations. The sedimentary environment is thought to be transitional continental to marginal marine, ranging from alluvial to braided rivers and deltas. Biostratigraphic data indicate a Late Cretaceous age (Cenomanian-Maastrichtian).

Itajaí-Açu Formation
Within this formation, the Ilhabela Member includes the turbiditic sandstones occurring along the section. The sedimentary environment is thought to be marine talus to open basin. Biostratigraphic data from palynomorphs, calcareous nanofossils and planktonic foraminifera indicate a Late Cretaceous age (Cenomanian-Maastrichtian).

Juréia Formation
The formation is characterized by dark grey to greenish and brown shales, dark grey siltstones, fine-very fine sandstones and light ochre calcisilts. The depositional environment is thought to be of a marine platform setting. The age based on palynomorphs and calcareous nanofossils is Late Cretaceous (Santonian-Maastrichtian). Two new ostracod species were identified in the drilling cuttings of wells drilled into the Santonian-Campanian section, ?Afrocytheridea cretacea and Pelecocythere dinglei.

V - Itamambuca Group (Cenozoic, upper post-salt sequence) 

Ponta Aguda Formation
The dominant facies are coarse to fine-grained quartzitic sandstones. They range from reddish to grey, usually with calcite cements. Intercalated are reddish to light grey claystones and siltstones. They represent a fluvial to shallow marine environment.

Iguape Formation
They are interbedded with grey-greenish clays, siltstones, marls and variegated grey fine-to-medium grained conglomerates. These facies are interbedded with and change laterally to the Marambaia Formation. The depositional environment is thought to be a marine carbonate platform, influenced by the arrival of alluvial clastics in the most proximal areas. Biostratigraphic data from planktonic foraminifera, calcareous nanofossils and palynomorphs indicate a Tertiary age.

Marambaia Formation
This formation in places can be found cropping out at sea bottom. The depositional environment is thought to be talus and open marine basin. Biostratigraphic data indicate a Tertiary age.

Sepetiba Formation (Pleistocene)
The Sepetiba Formation is the uppermost formation in the Santos Basin. It has a variable thickness due to the proximal erosion of the uppermost part. The formation consists of whitish grey fine to coarse grained carbonitic sands. They are feldspar-rich, glauconitic coquinas consisting of bivalve fragments and foraminifera. The depositional environment is thought to be coastal.

The stratigraphy following the classifications by Vieira 2007, Kiang Chang 2008 and Contreras 2011 is:

Basin analysis 
4D Basin analysis of the Santos Basin has revealed insights about the interplay among the elements and processes of the petroleum system to assess source rock potential (vertical and horizontal distribution), thermal evolution of the source rocks, transformation ratio, hydrocarbon generation and charge, timing of migration, oil origin, quality, and volume of petroleum in the main reservoirs. In a basin modeling study performed in 2008 and 2009, a detailed facies model from the pre-salt section was built based on well data and conceptual models from seismic interpretation associated with previous knowledge of the tectono-sedimentary sequences of the Santos Basin. The predicted vitrinite map, integrated with all data, indicates that the Coquinas source rock in most of the eastern half area is in the main oil window, whereas the western half is in the late oil/wet gas generation window. In terms of transformation ratio, the Barremian and Aptian source rock systems in the area reached 70% to 80% today where the main depocentres are. The charge and accumulation simulation model for the pre-salt province suggests a potential reserve in the Cluster area of Santos Basin much larger than that reported, getting numbers to 60 billion barrels of oil reserves.

Oil and gas exploration 

Exploration in the Santos Basin started in the 1970s. Between 1970 and 1987, 59 dry wells were drilled, with one discovery in Santonian turbidites in 1979, Merluza Field. Eighty-one wells were drilled from 1999 to 2005, leading to the discovery of the Mexilhão Field. Exploration boomed between 2006 and 2012, with 166 wells and the giant Tupi field (8 BBOE), discovered at the Tupi prospect in 2006.

Thanks to the pre-salt production, compensating for the declining post-salt production, the total oil production of Brazil rose above  in April 2016. The Lapa Field, originally named Carioca, was taken in production in December 2016. In 2017, the Santos Basin accounted for 35% of Brazil's oil, with the Campos Basin at 55%. In the same year, 76 blocks were open for bidding in the Santos Basin.

Oil and gas fields in the Santos Basin

See also 
 Angola Basin
 Campos Basin
 Paraná Basin
 Geology of Namibia

References

Bibliography

Brazil general

Santos Basin geology

Santos Basin exploration

External links